McEwen is an unincorporated community in Baker County, Oregon, United States. McEwen lies on Oregon Route 7 east of its interchange with Oregon Route 410.

McEwen was founded as a logging town, platted in 1891, and then was a rail stop on the Sumpter Valley Railway. It was named after a Mormon missionary who converted Charles W. Nibley's parents to the LDS Church.

Oregon Geographic Names links the community name to Thomas McEwen, a settler who filed a land claim here in 1888. The McEwen post office opened in 1893 and closed in 1943.

References

External links
Photos of McEwen by Chris and Tina Pfeiffer and Pwaully73

Unincorporated communities in Baker County, Oregon
Populated places established in 1891
1891 establishments in Oregon
Unincorporated communities in Oregon